

Television
John Saunders (Play-by-play, 1995–2001)
Dan Shulman (Secondary play-by-play, 1995–2001, TSN, 2012-present)
Rod Black (Secondary play-by-play, 1995–2001, primary play-by-play 2001-2005, CTV, TSN, Sportsnet, play-by-play, 2014-2021)
Paul Romanuk (Secondary play-by-play, 1998-2001, TSN)
Chuck Swirsky (Play-by-play, 2001–2008)
Jack Armstrong (Colour, 1998–present, TSN)
Leo Rautins (Colour, 1995–2021, Sportsnet)
Matt Devlin (Lead play-by-play, 2008–present)
Sherman Hamilton (Colour, 2008–present, NBA TV Canada)

Radio
Mike Inglis (Play-by-play, 1995–1998, CFRB)
Earl Cureton (Colour, 1997–1998, CFRB)
Chuck Swirsky (Play-by-play, 1998–2001, CJCL; TV simulcast of play-by-play, 2001–2004)
Jack Armstrong (Colour, 1998–2001, Fan 590; 2014-present, CHUM 1050)
Leo Rautins (TV simulcast of colour, 2001–2004, Fan 590)
Paul Romanuk (Play-by-play, 2004–2005, CJCL)
Paul Jones (Colour, 1995–1997, CFRB 1010; 2004–2005, 2014–present CJCL; Play-by-play, 2005–2014, CJCL; 2014–present, CHUM)
Eric Smith (Colour, 2005–2014, CJCL; play-by-play, 2014–present; CJCL)

Lists of National Basketball Association broadcasters
CTV Sports
Sportsnet
The Sports Network
Toronto-related lists
Ontario sport-related lists